The Northwest Association for Performing Arts (NWAPA) is a governing body and competitive circuit of high school marching bands, color guards, and percussion ensembles based in Portland, Oregon. The association was founded in 1997 as the Northwest Marching Band Circuit (NWMBC). A majority of the current members high schools are based in Oregon, with others from Washington, Idaho, and California.

On July 3, 2020, NWAPA announced it would not sanction any marching band events due to the coronavirus pandemic.

NWAPA is not affiliated with the similarly named North-West Pageantry Association (NWPA) based in the Puget Sound region.

History 
In 1997, Northwest Marching Band Circuit (NWMBC) was founded to "provide a circuit of standardized events" for high school marching bands in the region. Prior to its NWMBC's formation, the various marching band competitions in the Pacific Northwest utilized differing, and often conflicting, adjudication systems. For example, bands who attended Puget Sound Festival of Bands in Everett would earn one score which could not be directly compared to a score earned at the Cavalcade of Bands in the Tri-Cities, or the Sunset Classic in Portland. The inconsistency made it difficult for band directors to accurately assess their band's progress during the competitive season. The new circuit's paramount requirement was all members agreed to utilize the same adjudication system at any competitions they hosted. NWMBC circuit chose a modified version of the adjudication manual published by the Western States Marching Band Conference (WSMBC), which has been continually updated.

Membership has varied between twenty and forty members in recent years. At its peak, NWMBC grew to fifty-five member high schools and independent groups in 2006.

The circuit was reorganized as the Northwest Association for Performing Arts (NWAPA) in August 2008.

About 
NWAPA operates as a public benefit nonprofit corporation registered in the State of Oregon. As of 2017, the association has not been designated as a 501(c) tax exempt organization by the IRS. It is unknown if NWAPA (or NWMBC) has ever applied for such.

Governance 
Governed by a board of directors, NWAPA has nine elected officers: President, Fall Vice President, Winter Vice President–Color Guard, Winter Vice President–Percussion, Winter Vice President–Winds, Secretary, Treasurer and Past President. Each officer is elected for a two-year term.

All high school band directors, show sponsors and directors of independent or community groups who participate in NWAPA events are members of the association, and they are eligible to vote on association business and elect officers. Schools or groups who participate in two or more events in an academic year are required to pay a membership fee.

Archives and previous recaps 
Founding documents, early event films and videos, competition recaps and scores, judges commentary, and other materials have been lost. Without a designated historian or archivist, or a permanent administrative office, each new class of board members and officers are responsible for maintaining any materials which come into their possession from the previous class.

The association's website offers recaps from September 2011 to present. Contest scheduling and tabulation software is provided by Contest Dynamics, a custom package designed specifically for use by NWAPA.

Member bands and groups 

NWAPA events draw participants from throughout the Pacific Northwest. However, the majority of active members are from within 200 km of Portland. A few members are more distant, such as Kamiak High School from Mukilteo, Washington, Central Valley High School from Spokane Valley, Washington, and Timberline High School from Boise, Idaho. Schools such as Central Valley do not participate every year.

Bands who participate but who are not members are called "guest" bands or groups. Guest bands are not eligible for competition in championship finals. If a guest band earns a score which would ordinarily earn them a finalist position, then they are permitted to perform in exhibition.

The following high schools and independent groups are active as of August 2018. School districts with multiple schools have been grouped. Former members and previous guest bands also included.

California bands

Idaho bands

Oregon bands

Washington bands

Independent groups

Fall season 
The primary competitive season for most NWAPA members is the fall marching band season. More than 5,000 students and 20,000 spectators will attend NWAPA events from September to November each year. The most popular events are those whose history predate the founding of NWBMC, including: Pacific Coast Invitational sponsored by Sprague High School, Sunset Classic sponsored by Sunset High School, and the University of Oregon Festival of Bands.

The competitive season ends with the NWAPA Championships hosted the last Saturday of October or first Saturday of November by one of the founding members, or by either University of Oregon or Oregon State University.

Event model 
Events or "shows" are scheduled via a bidding process which begins several months before the competitive season. Considerations for awarding an event include available volunteer personnel and experience, past show sponsor history, and available facilities.

As of 2017, show sponsors must pay NWAPA an administrative fee, and all participating band attendance fees are also retained. As a result of this change, adjudicator travel, lodging, and other administrative functions are coordinated by NWAPA and not the show sponsor. This alleviated a number of on-going issues for sponsors, such as travel and lodging arrangements for visiting adjudicators. Show sponsors retain proceeds from ticket and concessions sales, revenue generated from advertising, and any other proceeds.

NWAPA's other responsibilities at events include: managing the flow of bands through the competitive space, assisting the show sponsor with any administrative needs on-site, and providing adjudication and tabulation.

Classification 
Marching band classifications are based on the number of marching members within each ensemble, including percussion and auxiliary/color guard. At present, there are four classes based on number of performing members in each band.

An Exhibition or festival class is available to visiting bands who wish to take advantage of performance opportunities. Exhibition bands receive comments from adjudicators. Many bands who sponsor events make use of Exhibition class, but they are not required to.

Adjudication 
Regardless of the competing classes, adjudication at NWAPA events is single-tier. The handbook does not make any adjustments or recommendations in scoring large or small bands. Each show requires eight adjudicators, and a tabulator.

In 2011, NWAPA's adjudication handbook was modified or adapted from the Bands of America Adjudication Handbook. The modified system required fewer adjudicators. However, NWAPA's handbook was changed the following year to increase the number of adjudicators to the previous number.

Captions and rubric 
Scoring is based on three broad categories: Effect, Music and Visual. The categories are further divided into six reference criteria, or captions, with each given a maximum value of 200 points, or up to 20 points when factored. One adjudicator is assigned to each caption, including one adjudicator for Percussion and Auxiliary. An additional adjudicator is responsible for Timing & Penalties.

The final score is tabulated by adding all captions, once factored, less any penalties.

NWAPA does not have captions for drum majors, twirling teams and majorettes, or dance teams. Performance excellence by a drum major is recognized by the Music or Visual adjudicators where appropriate. Twirlers and dance teams would fall under the responsibility of the Auxiliary adjudicator. Almost all participating bands will perform with a color guard team.

Placements and awards 
Beginning in Fall 2017, scores are no longer announced at shows. Podium placings (1st, 2nd and 3rd) are announced for each class following prelims, as well as awards for High Brass, High Visual, High General Effect, High Auxiliary, and High Percussion. For finals, only top five placing bands are announced, along with caption awards. At NWAPA Championships, an overall champion is also announced.

Caption recaps and scores are made public following the show.

Event flow 
Most events consist of two rounds: preliminary and final. In the preliminary round, bands compete based on class. The highest placing bands advance to the final round.

Preliminary round 
As of 2019, the performance order of performance for each class was set as A, AA, and AAA for all future events. Units within each class perform in order drawn at the beginning of the season.

Each show sponsor sets a maximum number of bands who will advance to the final round; typically between twelve and fifteen bands. The highest scoring band in each class automatically advances to the second round, as well as the next-highest scoring bands, regardless of class, up to the maximum number allowed.

Final round 
Finalists are ordered into groups of four, five or six based on their preliminary score called neighborhoods. The performance time for each band is the result of a random draw within each neighborhood. The size of each neighborhood is based on the number of competing bands who are advancing to the final round.

All finalist bands compete in Open class.

Official events 
On March 2, 2022, NWAPA announced the marching band events for the 2022 Fall season.

Past championship venues 
The following is an incomplete list of NWAPA and NWMBC marching band championship sites:

Winter season 
NWMBC developed offerings to color guards to continue competition into the winter season within a few years of its inception. As the activity expanded to include percussion and winds ensembles, the circuit followed suit.

Classification and adjudication 
Winter color guard and percussion ensemble classes are based on criteria published by Winter Guard International (WGI). WGI uses a multi-tier adjudication handbook which separates competing units into two conferences, Scholastic for middle schools and high schools, and Independent for community and collegiate groups. Competitive classes are then based on experience and achievement, and not school or team size. WGI competitive classes are Regional, A, Open and World. NWAPA has made a special class, Cadet, available to young and developing teams

A majority of NWAPA's winter members compete as Scholastic Regional and Scholastic A units. Oregon Crusaders Drum and Bugle Corps, and Seattle Cascades Drum and Bugle Corps have entered Independent A and Open units into competition in both color guard and percussion classes. Former WGI Independent World Class finalists Northern Lights and Rhapsody were NWAPA members.

The WGI Winds Adjudication System was adopted by NWAPA in 2015. Winds competition began in 2016.

Past champions

Marching band champions 
Following is an incomplete list of class and overall champions. Championship classes were realigned in 2021.

Winter guard champions 
Following is an incomplete list of class champions:

Scholastic conference

Independent conference

Percussion champions 
Following is an incomplete list of class champions:

Scholastic conference

Independent marching conference

Scholastic winds champions

See also 
 Bands of America
 Southern California School Band and Orchestra Association
 Tournament of Bands
 Western Band Association

Notes

References

External links 
 

High school marching bands from the United States
1997 establishments in the United States